is a Japanese kickboxer. He is the current Shoot Boxing Japan Featherweight and former Shoot Boxing Japan Bantamweight champion.

As of October 2022, he is ranked as the ninth best bantamweight in the world by Beyond Kick.

Kickboxing career

Bantamweight

Early career
Kawakami had a notable amateur career which saw him winning multiple titles including the Shoot Boxing All Japan in 2015. in 2016 he won the WBC Muay Thai All Japan Junior League title and was elected MVP of the event, as a reward he received a one month trip to Thailand.

Kawakami made his professional debut against Syuto Sato at SHOOT BOXING Osaka 2016 “Alpinisme vol.1” on August 13, 2016. He won the fight by a first-round standing choke submission. He won his next bout against Tsubasa Onishi at SHOOT BOXING Young Caesar Cup Central 18 on October 2, 2016, by stoppage as well, before being booked to face the unbeaten Koudai at SHOOT BOXING 2017 act.1 on February 11, 2017. He lost the fight by a second-round knockout.

Kawakami faced Kazuyuki Fushimi at SHOOT BOXING 2018 act.1 on February 10, 2018, in his first fight of the year. He won the bout by a flying knee knockout, at the 1:10 minute mark of the fourth round. Kawakami next faced Jin Uehira at SHOOT BOXING Osaka 2018 “Alpinisme” vol.1 on March 18, 2018. He needed just 79 seconds to stop Uehira with a body shot. Kawakami extended his winning streak to three consecutive fights with an extra round split decision win over Toshiyuki Nitamizu at SHOOT BOXING 2017 Young Caesar Cup Central 22 on May 20, 2018, in the quarterfinals of the Shootboxing bantamweight tournament.

Kawakami's three fight winning streak was snapped by the undefeated Yuki Kasahara at SHOOT BOXING 2018 act.4, who beat him by a first-round knockout, handing Kawakami his second career stoppage loss and eliminating him from the bantamweight tournament. Kawakami was next booked to face Keito Naito at SHOOT BOXING Osaka 2019 “Alpinisme” vol.1 on August 10, 2019. He won the fight by unanimous decision, with scores of 30–28, 30–28 and 30–29.

Shootboxing bantamweight champion
On November 11, 2019, Kawakami faced Syuto Sato for the inaugural Shoot Boxing Japan Bantamweight title at Shoot Boxing 2019 Young Caesar Cup Central #26. He won the fight by a second-round knockout, as he floored Sato with a left cross.

On November 14, 2020, Kawakami faced the reigning RISE super flyweight champion Kazuki Osaki in a non-title bout at RISE 143. He lost by unanimous decision.

Kawakami was scheduled to face the Yuki Kyotani at Rise World Series 2021 Osaka on July 18, 2021, in Osaka. He won the fight by unanimous decision, the three judges scoring the bout 30–29 in his favor.

Featherweight
Kawakami faced Kotaro Yamada at SHOOT BOXING 2021 Young Caesar Cup on December 19, 2021, in his first bout at the featherweight (-57.5kg) limit. The fight was ruled a draw after the first three rounds, with all three judges scoring the fight 29–29. Accordingly an extension round was fought, after which Kawakami was awarded a unanimous decision.

Kawakami faced Kaito for the vacant Shoot Boxing Japan Featherweight title at Shoot Boxing 2022 act.2 on April 10, 2022. He won the fight by majority decision, after an extra round was contested.

Kawakami faced Haruto Yasumoto at RISE WORLD SERIES / SHOOTBOXING-KINGS on December 25, 2022, in what was his third appearance with RISE. The bout was ruled a unanimous decision draw after the first three rounds, with all three judges scoring it 30–30. Kawakami was awarded a majority decision, after an extra fourth round was fought.

Kawakami faced Gaopayak Y'zdgym at SHOOT BOXING 2023 act.1 on February 12, 2023. He won the fight by unanimous decision, with scores of 30–29, 30–29 and 30–27.

Titles and accomplishments

Professional
SHOOT BOXING
 2019 Shoot Boxing Japan Bantamweight Champion
 2022 Shoot Boxing Japan Featherweight Champion

Amateur
 2014 Green Boy Fight Welterweight Champion
 2015 Glove Karate Federation All Japan Championship -55kg Winner
 2015 Shoot Boxing All Japan -55kg Champion
 2016 WBC Muay Thai All Japan Jr League (U-18) -55kg Champion & Event MVP

Fight record

|-  style="background:#cfc;"
| 2023-02-12 || Win ||align=left| Gaopayak Y'zdgym || SHOOT BOXING 2023 act.1|| Tokyo, Japan || Decision (Unanimous) || 3 ||3:00 
|-  style="background:#cfc;"
| 2022-12-25|| Win ||align=left| Haruto Yasumoto || RISE WORLD SERIES / SHOOTBOXING-KINGS|| Tokyo, Japan || Ext.R Decision (Majority) || 4 || 3:00
|-  style="background:#cfc;"
| 2022-04-10|| Win || align=left| Kaito Sakaguchi || SHOOT BOXING 2022 act.2|| Tokyo, Japan || Ext.R Decision (Majority)  ||6 ||3:00
|-
! style=background:white colspan=9 |

|-  style="background:#cfc;"
| 2021-12-19 || Win || align=left| Kotaro Yamada || SHOOT BOXING 2021 Young Caesar Cup || Tokyo, Japan ||Ext.R Decision (Split)  || 4 || 3:00

|-  style="background:#cfc;"
| 2021-07-18 || Win || align=left| Yuki Kyotani || RISE World Series 2021 Osaka || Osaka, Japan || Decision (Unanimous)  || 3 || 3:00

|-  style="text-align:center; background:#fbb;"
| 2020-11-14 || Loss ||align=left| Kazuki Osaki || RISE 143 || Tokyo, Japan||Decision (Unanimous)|| 3 || 3:00

|-  style="background:#cfc;"
| 2019-11-24|| Win || align=left| Shuto Sato || SHOOT BOXING 2019 Young Caesar Cup Central 26|| Kasugai, Aichi, Japan || KO (Left cross)  ||2 ||2:58
|-
! style=background:white colspan=9 |

|-  style="background:#cfc;"
| 2019-08-10 || Win || align=left| Keito Naito ||SHOOT BOXING Osaka 2019 “Alpinisme” vol.1 || Osaka, Japan || Decision (Unanimous) || 3 || 3:00

|-  style="text-align:center; background:#fbb;"
| 2018-09-15 || Loss ||align=left| Yuki Kasahara || SHOOT BOXING 2018 act.4 - Championship Tournament Semi Final || Tokyo, Japan ||KO (Left cross) || 1 || 3:00

|-  style="background:#cfc;"
| 2018-05-20 || Win || align=left| Toshiyuki Nitamizu ||SHOOT BOXING 2017 Young Caesar Cup Central 22 - Championship Tournament Quarter Final || Aichi prefecture, Japan || Ext.R Decision (Split)  || 4 || 3:00

|-  style="background:#cfc;"
| 2018-03-18|| Win || align=left| Jin Uehira ||	SHOOT BOXING Osaka 2018 “Alpinisme” vol.1|| Osaka, Japan || KO (Body shot) ||1 ||1:19

|-  style="background:#cfc;"
| 2018-02-10|| Win || align=left| Kazuyuki Fushimi || SHOOT BOXING 2018 act.1|| Tokyo, Japan || Ext.R KO (Flying knee) ||4 ||1:10

|-  style="background:#fbb;"
| 2017-10-15|| Loss || align=left| Hiroaki Okuwa || SHOOT BOXING 2017 Young Caesar Cup Central 21|| Kasugai, Aichi, Japan || Decision (Unanimous) ||3 ||3:00

|-  style="text-align:center; background:#fbb;"
| 2017-05-28|| Loss ||align=left| Itsuki Kobori || HIGHSPEED 2017 ～STATUS～|| Osaka, Japan || Decision (Split) || 3 || 3:00

|-  style="background:#fbb;"
| 2017-03-11|| Loss || align=left| Genki Takeno || SHOOT BOXING 2017 Young Caesar Cup act.1|| Tokyo, Japan || Decision (Majority)  ||3 ||3:00

|-  style="text-align:center; background:#fbb;"
| 2017-02-11 || Loss||align=left| Koudai || SHOOT BOXING 2017 act.1|| Tokyo, Japan || KO (Right cross) || 2 || 2:02

|-  style="background:#cfc;"
| 2016-10-02|| Win || align=left| Tsubasa Onishi || SHOOT BOXING Young Caesar Cup Central 18|| Kasugai, Aichi, Japan || KO || 3 ||

|-  style="background:#cfc;"
| 2016-08-13|| Win || align=left| Shuto Sato || SHOOT BOXING Osaka 2016 “Alpinisme vol.1”|| Osaka, Japan || TKO (Standing choke) || 3 ||1:00
|-
| colspan=9 | Legend:    

|-  style="background:#cfc;"
| 2016-07-23|| Win ||align=left|  ||2nd WBC Muay Thai All Japan Jr. League, Final|| Tokyo, Japan ||  Decision || 2 || 2:00
|-
! style=background:white colspan=9 |

|-  style="background:#cfc;"
| 2016-07-23|| Win ||align=left| Ryuto Nakamura ||2nd WBC Muay Thai All Japan Jr. League, Semi Final|| Tokyo, Japan ||  Decision || 2 || 2:00

|- style="text-align:center; background:#cfc;"
| 2016-05-21|| Win||align=left| Nobuhide Toyooka || S-1 Amateur Kick vol.7|| Nara, Japan || Decision ||2 ||2:00 

|- style="text-align:center; background:#fbb;"
| 2016-04-10|| Loss ||align=left| Kaito Yamawaki || NJKF West Japan YOUNG FIGHT 1st|| Osaka, Japan || Decision (Unanimous)||3 ||1:00 

|-  bgcolor="#cfc"
| 2016-01-24|| Win||align=left| Satoru Shimizu ||Amateur Shoot Boxing All Japan Championship || Tokyo, Japan || Decision (Unanimous) || 2 || 2:00
|-
! style=background:white colspan=9 |

|- style="text-align:center; background:#cfc;"
| 2015-12-20|| Win||align=left| Yu Morikawa || S-1 Amateur Kick vol.5|| Sakai, Japan || Decision ||2 ||2:00 

|-  bgcolor="#cfc"
| 2015-11-15|| Win ||align=left| Keito Naito ||Amateur Shoot Boxing Kansai || Osaka, Japan || Ext.R Decision (Split) || 3 || 2:00

|-  style="background:#fbb;"
| 2015-10-03|| Loss ||align=left| Riku Kitani ||Amateur Shootboxing || Tokyo, Japan ||  Decision (Unanimous) || 2 || 2:00

|- align="center"  bgcolor="#CFC"
| 2015-04-12|| Win ||align=left| Tomoya Nishida || Amateur Shoot Boxing Kansai|| Kansai, Japan || Decision (Unanimous) || 2|| 2:00

|-  style="background:#fbb;"
| 2014-12-21|| Loss ||align=left| Toki Tamaru ||All Japan Amateur Shootboxing || Tokyo, Japan ||  Decision (Unanimous) || 2 || 2:00
|-
! style=background:white colspan=9 |

|- align="center"  bgcolor="#CFC"
| 2014-11-23|| Win ||align=left| Sota Kimura ||NEXT LEVEL Kansai 18|| Sakai, Japan || Decision (Unanimous) || 2|| 2:00

|- align="center"  bgcolor="#CFC"
| 2014-11-16|| Win ||align=left| Makoto Matsuo ||Hoost Cup KINGS WEST|| Osaka, Japan || Decision (Unanimous) || 2|| 2:00

|-  style="background:#fbb;"
| 2014-10-13|| Loss ||align=left| Haruto Yasumoto || MUAYTHAI WINDY SUPER FIGHT vol.18 in KYOTO || Kyoto, Japan ||  Decision (Unanimous)  || 2 || 2:00

|- align="center"  bgcolor="#CFC"
| 2014-10-05|| Win ||align=left| Kaito Nagashima || Striking Challenge 42, All Japan Shootboxing selection || Nagoya, Japan || Decision (Unanimous) || 2|| 2:00

|- align="center"  bgcolor="#CFC"
| 2014-09-23|| Win ||align=left| Ryunosuke Abiru ||NEXT LEVEL Kansai 17|| Sakai, Japan || Decision (Unanimous) || 2|| 2:00

|-  bgcolor="#cfc"
| 2014-09-14 ||Win ||align=left| ||Shoot Boxing Amateur Kansai tournament, Final || Osaka, Japan || Decision  || 1 ||2:00

|-  bgcolor="#cfc"
| 2014-09-14 ||Win ||align=left| ||Shoot Boxing Amateur Kansai tournament, Semi Final || Osaka, Japan || Decision  || 1 ||2:00

|-  style="background:#cfc;"
| 2014-07-30|| Win ||align=left| Jui Nishiyama || Green Boy Fight 8 || Kyoto, Japan ||  Decision || 2 || 2:00
|-
! style=background:white colspan=9 |

|- align="center"  bgcolor="#CFC"
| 2014-06-29|| Win ||align=left| Yuki Kasahara ||Amateur Shootboxing Kansai || Osaka, Japan || Ext.R Decision (Unanimous) || 3|| 2:00

|- align="center"  bgcolor="#CFC"
| 2014-03-16|| Win ||align=left| Taiki Kaminoura ||NEXT LEVEL Kansai 13|| Sakai, Japan || Decision (Unanimous) || 2|| 2:00

|- align="center"  bgcolor="#CFC"
| 2014-03-16|| Win ||align=left| Shinya Hirota ||NEXT LEVEL Kansai 13|| Sakai, Japan || Decision (Unanimous) || 2|| 2:00

|-  bgcolor="#cfc"
| 2014-02-16|| Win ||align=left| Ayumu Mita ||Shoot Boxing Amateur Kansai || Osaka, Japan || Decision (Majority) || 2 || 2:00

|-  bgcolor="#fbb"
| 2013-04-14|| Loss ||align=left| Kaito Sakaguchi ||Shoot Boxing Amateur Kansai || Kansai, Japan || Decision (Unanimous) || 2 || 2:00

|-  bgcolor="#fbb"
| 2013-04-14|| Loss ||align=left| Katsuya Aoki ||NEXT LEVEL Kansai 6|| Kansai, Japan || Decision (Majority) || 2 || 2:00

|- style="text-align:center; background:#cfc;"
| 2013-02-24|| Win ||align=left| Aoshi Kitano || Amateur Shootboxing || Osaka, Japan || Decision (Unanimous)|| 2 || 2:00

|-  bgcolor="#fbb"
| 2013-01-27|| Loss ||align=left| Katsuya Aoki ||NEXT LEVEL Kansai 4|| Sakai, Japan || Decision (Majority) || 2 || 2:00

|-  bgcolor="#c5d2ea"
| 2013-01-20|| Draw ||align=left| Musashi Kajiwara ||Kameoka Winter Festival 2013|| Kameoka, Japan || Decision  || 2 || 2:00

|-  bgcolor="#cfc"
| 2012-12-16|| Win ||align=left| Shuma Sasaki ||NEXT LEVEL Kansai 3|| Osaka, Japan || Decision (Majority) || 2 || 2:00

|-  bgcolor="#fbb"
| 2012-09-23|| Loss ||align=left| Riona Ishikawa ||NEXT LEVEL, Semi Final|| Sakai, Japan || Decision (Unanimous) || 2 || 2:00

|- align="center"  bgcolor="#c5d2ea"
| 2012-07-16|| Draw||align=left| Makoto Matsuo ||NEXT LEVEL|| Sakai, Japan || Decision (Unanimous) || 2|| 2:00

|- align="center"  bgcolor="#c5d2ea"
| 2012-05-06|| Draw||align=left| Yosuke Sekimoto ||NEXT LEVEL|| Higashioka, Japan || Decision  || 2|| 2:00

|-
| colspan=9 | Legend:

See also
List of male kickboxers

References

Living people
1999 births
Japanese male kickboxers
Sportspeople from Osaka
21st-century Japanese people